Blue & Gray II, subtitled "Four American Civil War Battles", is a collection of four board wargames originally published by Simulations Publications, Inc. (SPI) in 1975 that each simulate a battle from the American Civil War. It is the sequel to Blue & Gray published earlier in the year. Each of the four games was also published as individual "folio games."

Description
Blue & Gray II is a quadrigame, a single box with four different games that use the same rules. The four games included are:
 Fredericksburg: The Union Repulsed, designed by Joe Angiolillo
Hooker and Lee: The Battle of Chancellorsville, designed by Richard Berg
Chattanooga: Gateway to Victory, designed by Frederick Georgian
Battle of the Wilderness: Gaining the Initiative, designed by Linda Mosca
In addition to the common set of rules, each separate game has a few exclusive rules. Compared to "monster" wargames of the time that had more than 1000 counters and lasted for several days, each of these battles uses 100 or fewer counters and can be completed in a few hours.

Gameplay
For their 1971 wargame Napoleon at Waterloo, SPI developed a simple alternating "I Go, You Go" system of turns where one player moves and then fires, followed by the other player. Blue & Gray II and subsequent SPI quadrigames use this system. Two of the games, Fredericksburg and Hooker and Lee, can be combined into one campaign game.

Publication history
In 1975, SPI published their first "quadrigame", Blue & Gray. The new game immediately rose to #1 on SPI's Top Ten Bestseller list the month it was released, and SPI immediately released another quadrigame of Civil War battles titled Blue & Gray II. It also proved popular, rising to #6 on SPI's Bestseller list and staying on the list for six months. Several more Blue & Gray battles were also published in SPI's house magazine Strategy & Tactics.

Each of the individual games was also published as a "folio game", a game packaged in a cardstock folio.

Reception
In the April 1976 edition of Airfix Magazine, Bruce Quarrie called this "Good, exciting stuff, challenging for experienced players but basic enough to make a good starting point for anyone interested in the Civil War and wishing to try board wargaming."

In a 1976 poll of wargamers conducted by SPI to determine the most popular wargame in America, Blue & Gray II placed 54th out of 202 wargames.

In his 1977 book The Comprehensive Guide to Board Wargaming, Nicholas Palmer called this sequel "Not quite such a hit [as Blue & Gray] but still favoured." Looking at the individual games, Palmer thought Hooker and Lee "Short (nine turns), but with interesting dilemmas for both sides"; Fredericksburg was "One of the less popular games in the Blue & Gray Quads";  and Battle of the Wilderness was "limited to the roads and tracks of the wooded areas." 

In the 1980 book The Complete Book of Wargames, game designer Jon Freeman noted that only Battle of the Wilderness allowed for fluid movement, and two of the games are relatively simple assaults on prepared positions. He concluded "As a whole, this is a handy but not essential group, and it's not as attractive as Napoleon at War.

In a retrospective review in Issue 20 of Simulacrum, Steve Bucey noted, "This is certainly not a simulation. However, it is a very playable game system that often demands careful thought during play. The combination of easy-to-learn rules and short scenarios makes this an excellent alternative when time and attention are short."

Other reviews and commentary
Moves #54
 Strategy & Tactics #54
 Fire & Movement #83
 Campaign #102
 Jagdpanther #12
 Ann Arbor Wargamer #10

References

American Civil War board wargames
Board games introduced in 1975
Simulations Publications games
Wargames introduced in 1975